Jitka Bartoničková (born on the 22 December 1985 in Benešov) is a sprinter from Czech Republic.

Personal bests

Competition record

References

External links 
 

Czech female sprinters
Olympic athletes of the Czech Republic
Athletes (track and field) at the 2012 Summer Olympics
1985 births
Living people
European Athletics Championships medalists
People from Benešov
World Athletics Indoor Championships medalists
Olympic female sprinters
Sportspeople from the Central Bohemian Region